Dropping the Writ is the third studio album released by musician Cass McCombs. The album was released on October 9, 2007 by Domino Records.

Track listing
All tracks by Cass McCombs

"Lionkiller" – 4:31
"Pregnant Pause" – 3:29
"That's That" – 4:15
"Petrified Forest" – 3:59
"Morning Shadows" – 2:56
"Deseret" – 3:54
"Crick in My Neck" – 4:19
"Full Moon or Infinity" – 4:25
"Windfall" – 4:48
"Wheel of Fortune" – 6:14

Personnel 

Rob Barbato – theremin
Aaron Shugart Brown – design, photography
Ben Chappell – layout design
Jerry Di Rienzo – engineer
Travis Graves – vocals
Albert Herter – paintings
George Horn – mastering
Claire Lin – layout design
Cass McCombs – bass, guitar, piano, sound effects, vocals, engineer, design, photography
Orpheo McCord – percussion, drums
Matt Popieluch – acoustic Guitar, piano, vocals
Garrett Ray – drums
Andrew Scheps – mixing
Trevor Shimizu – guitar
Luke Top – bass, vocals, engineer

References

External links
Cass McCombs (official site)
Dropping the Writ review

2007 albums
Cass McCombs albums